Single Flame, the second album of British singer-songwriter Lucy Ward, was released in the United Kingdom by Navigator Records on 19 August 2013. It was critically acclaimed and received a four-starred review in The Guardian.

Songs
The album includes "For the Dead Men", a self-penned protest song, which was released as a single in January 2012 coupled with a remixed version of "Maids When You’re Young" (a  song that had been included on Ward's debut album Adelphi Has to Fly.

Reception
In a four-starred review for The Guardian, Robin Denselow said that Lucy Ward "proves to be an even more mature and thoughtful singer-songwriter than she was on Adelphi Has to Fly" and described her follow-up album as "impressive and original" and "a brooding, often angry set that deals with everything from politics to love, death and personal tragedy, with a couple of powerful traditional songs added in".

Hazel Davis, for americanaUK, described it as a much angrier album than her debut release but "a genuinely eclectic sounding collection" with "songs that are Thea Gilmore-good".

Simon Holland, for Folk Radio UK, said that the album was "charged, emotive and utterly compelling".

Track listing
 "I Cannot Say I Will Not Speak" (Lucy Ward) 4:04 	
 "Honey" (Stu Hanna/Lucy Ward) 3:41 	
 "The Last Pirouette" (Lucy Ward) 3:55 	
 "Icarus" (Lucy Ward) 5:14 	
 "Velvet Sky" (Stu Hanna/Lucy Ward) 4:13 	
 "Rites of Man" (Lucy Ward) 5:08 	
 "The Consequence" (Lucy Ward) 2:15 	 	
 "Lord I Don't Want To Die in the Storm (Stu Hanna/Lucy Ward) 4:09 	
 "For the Dead Men" (Lucy Ward) 4:25 	
 "Marching Through the Green Grass" (Traditional) 2:50 	
 "Ink" (Lucy Ward) 4:11 	
 "Shellback" (Lucy Ward) 4:38
Total album length = 48:43

Personnel
 Lucy Ward – vocals, guitar, concertina
 Izzl Cooper – cello
 Anna Esslemont – violin (on "For the Dead Men")
 Joy Gravestock – violin
 Sebastian Hale Smith – double bass 
 Debbie Hanna – backing vocals
 Stu Hanna – guitar, banjo, mandolin, fiddle, B3 organ and backing vocals
 Sam Pegg –  bass guitar
 Stephen MacLachlan – drums

Production
Single Flame was produced by Stu Hanna from Megson, who also performs on the album, with his wife Debbie Hanna providing backing vocals. The photography and artwork on the CD cover was by Elly Lucas.

Notes and references

External links
 Lucy Ward: Official website

2013 albums
Lucy Ward (musician) albums
Navigator Records albums